"The Perfect Drug" is a song by Nine Inch Nails written for the David Lynch film Lost Highway. It was released in 1997 on the Lost Highway soundtrack as well as a single from the score. Remixes of the song were released as an EP, "The Perfect Drug" Versions.

Though "The Perfect Drug" Versions acts as a single for the titular song, the original version does not appear on the EP. The track has also been included on international singles "We're in This Together, Part 3" and "Into the Void" without the ending truncated; the only audio release of it in North America being on the Lost Highway soundtrack. A music video for it was directed by Mark Romanek, included with Closure, a VHS compilation and The Work of Director Mark Romanek.

In September 2018 the band performed the song live for the first time at Red Rocks Amphitheatre.

Song
"The Perfect Drug" was described by Entertainment Weekly as a "drum-and-bass-infused industrial pop song". The Guardian also noted the drum and bass influence in the song. Despite being a single, "The Perfect Drug" did not appear live until September 18, 2018 at Red Rocks Amphitheatre in Colorado. On the official NIN website, a fan asked whether the track had not been performed live is because "the drum solo would make Jerome's arms fall off." Then-drummer Jerome Dillon replied that they "never rule out the possibility of playing any of the songs live."

On April 6, 2005, while presenting the late-night BBC Radio 1 Rock Show in the UK, Trent Reznor responded to the question, "Which piece of your own work are you least satisfied with and why?" by saying:

Music video
A music video for the single was directed by Mark Romanek and released on January 18, 1997. The theme was inspired by the illustrations of 20th-century artist Edward Gorey, with familiar Gorey elements including oversized urns and glum, pale characters in full Edwardian costume. The most obvious reference to Gorey is the boy sitting on a cushion in front of a painting. Other references include an unidentified painting resembling Gustav Klimt's The Kiss (1907–1908) and a "Scanning Machine" designed by Frenchman François Willème in 1860.

Charlie Clouser, Danny Lohner, and Chris Vrenna also appear in the video, most notably playing string instruments at the beginning of the video. The entire video was filmed with a blue tint, with the exception of the drum breakdown, which uses flashing green light instead. Joanne Gair's work with Nine Inch Nails on "The Perfect Drug" won her the makeup portion of the award for best hair/makeup in a music video at the Music Video Production Awards.

EP
"The Perfect Drug" Versions is the eleventh official Nine Inch Nails release and consists of five remixes of the song "The Perfect Drug."  The European, Australian, and Japanese releases append the original version of the song, while a promotional vinyl set adds an exclusive sixth remix, by Aphrodite.

Track listing
Available as United States, Australia, Japan or EU single.

Charts

Weekly charts

Year-end charts

Cover versions and samples 
In 2002, American post-hardcore band the Blood Brothers sampled the song in their song "Kiss of the Octopus". American deathcore band Fit for an Autopsy covered the song for the split EP The Depression Sessions in 2016.

References

External links
The Perfect Drug at nin.com, the official website
The Perfect Drug at the NinWiki
Clip of the making of "The Perfect Drug" video with Mark Romanek
Halo 11 at NIN collector
discogs.com: The Perfect Drug (US CD5" Promo)
discogs.com: "The Perfect Drug" Versions (US CD5")
discogs.com: "The Perfect Drug" Versions (EU CD5")
discogs.com: "The Perfect Drug" Versions (EU 3x12")

1997 songs
1997 singles
Nine Inch Nails songs
Songs written by Trent Reznor
Music videos directed by Mark Romanek
1997 EPs
Nothing Records singles
Interscope Records singles
Songs written for films